Rasikendra Nath Nandi (also known as Rasik Nandi) a Vaishnav scholar, a social reformer and a zamindar was born in the village named Bhat-bera in district Pabna of undivided Bengal (now in Sirajganj District, Bangladesh) in 1882.  As a serious scholar of Vaishnavism, he wrote several manuscripts explaining the Vaishnavism in simple Sanskrit. Apart from his scholarly activities, he established schools for spreading of modern education in Pabna and in Agarpara (near Kolkata), where he died in 1962. Rasikendra Nath is one among those unsung stars of Bengal who was forgotten in the midst of political and economic turmoil of Bengal after Indian independence.

Family

Rasikendra Nath Nandi belonged to a Varendra Kayastha family of Pabna. His father Radhabinod Nandi, a follower of Gaudiya Vaishnavism was a petty Zamindar of Pabna district. Radhabinod's family, originally belongs to Nandi family of Baghutia, was a staunch follower of Gaudiya Vaishnavism. They used to worship Radha-Vinod  (deities of Sree Radha and Lord Krishna). Their family vigraha (idols) of Radha-Vinod had been crafted in Jaipur sometime between 1840 and 1850. This is a replica of the original vigraha of Radha-Vinod presently kept in Jaipur, Rajasthan. A portion of the Zamindari in Pabna was dedicated for the service of Radha-Vinod. The present members of the family of Rasikendra Nath still worship Radha-Vinod with great respect and devotion.

Education

As per the family tradition, Rasikendra was educated in Sanskrit and Vaishnav literature at Nabadwip (now in Nadia district, West Bengal). He obtained Kavya Vyakarana Tirtha, a traditional diploma in Sanskrit grammar and poetics. Later he graduated from Bangabasi College of the University of Calcutta.

Life

As a scholar of Vaishnavism, Rasikendra Nath wrote several manuscripts in Sanskrit, explaining Vaishnav philosophy. Unfortunately, most of those manuscripts are lost today. Rasikendra Nath translated Ujjwal Neelmani, famous work of Sri Roop Goswami, into simple Bengali.

Rasikendra Nath Nandi was actively involved with the spread of education in rural Pabna. K.M. Institution, one of the earliest schools in the region, was set up by him in 1915 at Lahiri Mohanpur (now in Ullahpara Upazila, Bangladesh). This school was established with the help of Kshitish Mohan Lahiri of Lahiri Mohanpur. Rasikendra Nath provided his service as the Headmaster of the school for first twelve years. He was associated with the establishments of several other schools in that region of Bengal. The family of Rasikendra Nath migrated to Ushumpur, Agarpara in North 24 Parganas district, near Kolkata with thousands of other refugee families after the partition of Bengal in 1947. In Agarpara, Rasikendra Nath established another school named Netaji Adarsha Vidyalaya. He died in 1962 at the age of 80 in Agarpara.

References
This article is based on an interview, given by Rajendra Nath Nandi.

Nandi, Rasikendra Nath
Bangabasi College alumni
Nandi, Rasikendra Nath
1962 deaths
Year of birth missing
People from Pabna District